The Turkish Authors' Association (abbreviated as TYB) is an association for writers in Turkey. It is sometimes confused with the Turkish Writers' Union as both may be translated as Writers Union of Turkey.

It gives awards to Turkish writers and media.

It has been a member of the European Writers' Council since 1977.

References

External links
 Official website

1974 establishments in Turkey
Trade unions in Turkey
Writers' organizations by country